Nam Pat is a district (amphoe) of Uttaradit province, northern Thailand.

Geography
Neighboring districts are (from the south clockwise) Chat Trakan of Phitsanulok province and Thong Saen Khan, Tha Pla, and Fak Tha of Uttaradit Province. To the east is Xaignabouli of Laos.

The main river of the district is the Pat River.

History
Originally named Saen To as the main tambon, it was renamed Nam Pat in 1932.

Nam Pat Wildlife Sanctuary was established in 2001.

Administration

Central administration 
Nam Pat is divided into seven sub-districts (tambon), which are further subdivided into 58 administrative villages (Muban).

Local administration 
There is one sub-district municipality (thesaban tambon) in the district:
 Nam Pat consisting of parts of sub-district Saen To.

There are seven sub-district administrative organizations (SAO) in the district:
 Saen To consisting of parts of sub-district Saen To.
 Ban Fai consisting of sub-district Ban Fai.
 Den Lek consisting of sub-district Den Lek.
 Nam Khrai consisting of sub-district Nam Khrai.
 Nam Phai consisting of sub-district Nam Phai.
 Huai Mun consisting of sub-district Huai Mun.
 Tha Faek consisting of sub-district Tha Faek.

References

External links
amphoe.com

Nam Pat